The Sportbund Schild des Reichsbundes jüdischer Frontsoldaten (en: Sports Association Shield of the Reich Federation of Jewish Frontline Soldiers) was a Jewish sports association established in 1925 as the sports arm of the Reichsbund jüdischer Frontsoldaten (en: Reich Federation of Jewish Frontline Soldiers). The RjF was formed in 1919 as a patriotic association of Jewish war veterans to demonstrate Jewish loyalty to Germany and to challenge rising anti-semitism. Throughout its existence the association was led by Dr. Leo Löwenstein, who had served as an army Captain. He was also the founder and chairman of the RjF from its inception until its dissolution.

Initially Schild was narrowly focused on gymnastics and martial arts including Judo and Jiu-Jitsu. After the rise of the Nazis, Jews faced increasing persecution and were driven from mainstream sports clubs and associations. As a result, new departments were formed within Schild after 1932 including athletics, water sports, skiing, fencing, and football. More broadly, new sports clubs emerged as part of the organization.

The activities of the RjF were outlawed by the Nazi regime in 1936, and in late 1938 it was dissolved.

References

Dietrich Schulze-Marmeling (ed.): Star of David and leather ball. The History of the Jews in German and International Football . The workshop, Goettingen 2003, ISBN 3-89533-407-3

Defunct sports clubs in Germany
Defunct Jewish organizations
Sports clubs established in 1925
Sports clubs disestablished in 1938